Trebgast is a river of Bavaria, Germany. It is a left tributary of the White Main near the village Trebgast.

See also
List of rivers of Bavaria

References

Rivers of Bavaria
Bayreuth (district)
Kulmbach (district)
Rivers of Germany